is a four-year  private university in the city of Gifu, Gifu Prefecture, Japan, and was founded in 1968. Its name is abbreviated as Gifu Joshi Dai (岐阜女子大) or GWU.

External links
 Official website 

Educational institutions established in 1968
Private universities and colleges in Japan
Buildings and structures in Gifu
Universities and colleges in Gifu Prefecture
Women's universities and colleges in Japan